Maravarman Sundara Pandyan II  was a Pandyan king, who ruled regions of South India between 1238–1240 CE.

Shared rule

Sundara Pandiyan II was one of two Pandyan princes who acceded to power in 1238 after Maravarman Sundara Pandyan I. He shared his rule with his elder brother Jatavarman Kulasekaran II for two years. This practice of shared rule with one prince asserting primacy was common in the Pandyan Kingdom. His years of reign are unclear. While KA Nilakanta Sastri mentions him as the Pandyan prince defeated by Rajendra Chola III around 1250, N Sethuraman mentions another Pandyan prince - Jatavarman Vikkiraman I as the Pandyan ruler between 1241 and 1250.

Hoysala influence
This period was marked with increasing Hoysala influence over Chola kingdom under the rule of Vira Someshwara. According to KA Nilakanta Sastri

Hoysala influence over the whole area of the Chola kingdom and even in the Pandya country increased steadily from about 1220 to 1245, a period which may  be well described as that of Hoysala hegemony in the south.

The Pandyan inscriptions of this period indicate tribute being paid to the Hoysala king. The kilacheval temple grants, Vira Somi Chathurvedimangalam land grants and the presence of a Hoysala general Appana Dandanayaka for settling disputes at Thirumayam all indicate Hoysala dominance over the Chola Country.

War with Cholas
Sundara Pandiyan II was attacked and defeated by the Rajendra Chola III around 1250. To prevent the complete revival of Chola power, Vira Someshwara temporarily allied himself with the Pandyas

Notes

References
 
 
 
 

Pandyan kings
Tamil history
Year of death unknown
Year of birth unknown
13th-century Indian monarchs
13th-century Hindus